Victor Wernersson (born 6 July 1995) is a Swedish footballer who plays as a left back for Eerste Divisie club NAC Breda.

Club career
On 1 September 2020, Wernersson joined Mechelen in Belgium. On 5 August 2021, Wernersson was loaned to Norwegian club Stabæk until the end of 2021. On 3 March 2022, the loan was extended for the 2022 season.

In January 2023, Wernersson joined Eerste Divisie club NAC Breda on an eighteen-month contract following a trial period with the club.

References

External links 
 
 

1995 births
Footballers from Malmö
Living people
Swedish footballers
Association football defenders
Malmö FF players
Syrianska FC players
Vejle Boldklub players
IFK Göteborg players
K.V. Mechelen players
Stabæk Fotball players
NAC Breda players
Allsvenskan players
Superettan players
Danish 1st Division players
Belgian Pro League players
Eliteserien players
Norwegian First Division players
Swedish expatriate footballers
Expatriate men's footballers in Denmark
Swedish expatriate sportspeople in Denmark
Expatriate footballers in Belgium
Swedish expatriate sportspeople in Belgium
Expatriate footballers in Norway
Swedish expatriate sportspeople in Norway
Expatriate footballers in the Netherlands
Swedish expatriate sportspeople in the Netherlands